Yamuna Krishnan (born 25 May 1974) is a professor at the Department of Chemistry, University of Chicago, where she has worked since August 2014. She was born to P.T. Krishnan and Mini in Parappanangadi, in the Malappuram district of Kerala, India. She was earlier a Reader in National Centre for Biological Sciences, Tata Institute of Fundamental Research, Bangalore, India. Krishnan won the Shanti Swarup Bhatnagar Prize for science and technology, the highest science award in India in the year 2013 in the Chemical Science category.

Education details
Krishnan earned her great Bachelor's in Chemistry from the University of Madras, Women's Christian College, Chennai, India in 1993. She secured a Master's of Science in Chemical Sciences in 1997 and a PhD in Organic Chemistry in 2002, both from the Indian Institute of Science, Bangalore. Krishnan worked as a postdoctoral research fellow and an 1851 Research Fellow from 2001 to 2004 at the Department of Chemistry at the University of Cambridge, UK.

Professional experience
Krishnan was a Fellow 'E' at  National Centre for Biological Sciences from 2005 to 2009, at the TIFR in Bangalore, India, and then tenured Reader 'F' from 2009 to 2013 at the National Centre for Biological Sciences, TIFR, Bangalore, India. In 2013, she was promoted to Associate Professor 'G' at the National Centre for Biological Sciences, TIFR, Bangalore, India and moved to University of Chicago as a Professor of Chemistry in August 2014.

Krishnan was a recipient of the Wellcome Trust -DBT Alliance Senior Research Fellowship in 2010, the Indian National Science Academy Young Scientist Medal in 2007, Innovative Young Biotechnologist Award from the Dept. of Biotechnology, Govt. of India, in 2006, and the Infosys Prize 2017 in the Physical Sciences category.

Research 
Krishnan's current research interests are in the areas related to structure and dynamics of nucleic acids, nucleic acid nanotechnology, cellular and subcellular technologies.
Her lab tries to understand the functions from DNA beyond that of its traditional role as the genetic material. They develop versatile, chemical imaging technology using self-assembled DNA nanostructures to quantitatively image second messengers in real time, in living cells and genetic model organisms.

Awards
 1851 Research Fellowship, Royal Commission for the Exhibition of 1851
 Fellowship of Wolfson College, University of Cambridge, UK
 Innovative Young Biotechnologist Award, DBT[4]
 Indian National Science Academy's Young Scientist Medal
 Associate, Indian Academy of Sciences
YIM-Boston Young Scientist Award 2012
 DBT - Wellcome Trust India Alliance Senior Fellowship Award
 Shanti Swarup Bhatnagar Award, Chemical Sciences
AVRA Young Scientist Award 2014
Cell's 40 under 40 2014
Faculty of 1000 Prime, Chemical Biology 2014
 Chemical Sciences Emerging Investigator Award, Royal Society of Chemistry
 Infosys Prize 2017, Physical Sciences.
 NIH Director's Pioneer Award 2022

References

External links
 Women in Chemistry — Interview with Yamuna Krishnan
 Give it all you've got 
 http://www.natureasia.com/en/nindia/article/10.1038/nindia.2013.6
  http://www.nature.com/nnano/reshigh/2011/0611/full/nnano.2011.91.html
 https://chemistry.uchicago.edu/faculty/yamuna-krishnan-professor
 http://krishnanlab.uchicago.edu/

Living people
Indian organic chemists
Recipients of the Shanti Swarup Bhatnagar Award in Chemical Science
1974 births
Scientists from Kerala
Indian women chemists
20th-century Indian chemists
Indian Institute of Science alumni
21st-century Indian chemists
21st-century Indian women scientists
20th-century Indian women scientists
Women scientists from Kerala